Neil Thomas McCorkell (23 March 1912 – 28 February 2013) was an English cricketer. He was right-handed batsman who fielded as a wicket-keeper. He was born at Portsmouth, Hampshire.  Debuting for Hampshire County Cricket Club in 1932, McCorkell played first-class cricket for Hampshire in two periods, from 1932 to 1939, then after World War II from 1946 to 1951.  Statistically he ended his first-class career as Hampshire's most successful wicket-keeper in first-class cricket, with 677 dismissals, although Bobby Parks later overtook that total. Following his retirement he emigrated to South Africa, where he still resided until his death.  In 2012, he became the 16th first-class cricketer to reach 100 years of age.

Early life

McCorkell was born on 23 March 1912, at White Hart Lane (today White Hart Road) in Old Portsmouth and was educated at the Portsmouth Town School in the 1920s and early 1930s.  He learned his early cricket playing for various church teams based in the city, and in a letter written to Hampshire cricket historian Dave Allen in the early 2000s, McCorkell explained how he had "progressed to play for Portsmouth District against Hampshire Club & Ground and was then invited to join the staff as a junior professional at the age of 19 on 1 April 1931."

In the decade preceding McCorkell joining Hampshire, Walter Livsey and George Brown kept wicket for the county Livsey's playing career ended in 1929, with Brown's career coming to an end by the early 1930s. McCorkell made his first-class debut for Hampshire in the 1932 County Championship against Somerset at Taunton. He established himself as a regular member of the Hampshire starting XI during that season, making 28 first-class appearances. While McCorkell did not stand out with the bat, scoring 499 runs at an average of 13.86, it was behind the stumps that he showed his talent, so much so that he did well enough to be selected for the end of season Gentlemen v Players fixture, with McCorkell representing the Players. In his debut season he claimed 38 catches and made 33 stumpings.  He gained his Hampshire cap at the end of this season.

Pre-war career
Having cemented his place as Hampshire's first choice wicket-keeper, McCorkell made 33 first-class appearances during the 1933 season, scoring 739 runs at an average of 18.94, with a high score of 57, one of two fifties he made in that season.  He was again reliable behind the stumps too, taking 46 catches and making 10 stumpings. He featured in 29 first-class matches in the 1934 season, though failed to improve on his previous seasons batting, scoring 490 runs at an average of 14.00, with a high score of exactly fifty, while behind the stumps he was steadily reliable, taking 50 catches and making 14 stumpings. In 1935, he featured in 29 first-class matches, which included 59 batting innings.  It was during this season that he established himself with the bat, passing a thousand runs during the season with a tally of 1,319 at an average of 24.42. He recorded his first century midway through this season against Lancashire with a score of 150 at the County Ground, Southampton. He recorded two further centuries in that season, in addition to making four half centuries.  He took 40 catches and made 19 stumpings, further establishing himself as Hampshire's first choice wicket-keeper, with both his keeping and batting skills.  The following season he once again passed 1,000 runs, scoring 1,350 at an average of exactly 27 in 32 first-class matches. He made just a single century in this season, with a score of 114 against Glamorgan at Dean Park, Bournemouth. Again solid behind the stumps, McCorkell claimed 51 catches and 15 stumpings.  He also appeared for a second and final time for the Players against the Gentlemen at Lord's in 1936.

McCorkell played in 30 first-class matches for Hampshire in the 1937 season, having his most productive since his debut in 1932, passing a thousand runs with 1,506 runs at an average of 27.88.  He scored two centuries and ten half centuries in this season, as well as taking 50 catches and 18 stumpings. His performances in this season earned him a call up to teammate Lionel Tennyson's touring team to India in the winter of 1937. He played ten first-class matches on the tour against a selection of personal XIs of Maharajas, provincial/regional teams and one match against India itself. The tour was uneventful for McCorkell, with him scoring 241 runs and recording just a single half century, while taking 16 catches and making 5 stumpings. This was to be his only overseas tour.  McCorkell made 33 first-class appearances in 1938, once again passing a thousand runs for the season for the fourth season in a row.  His batting statistics were similar to those of the 1937 English season, with 1,586 runs at an average of 27.82, with a single century score of 136 and seven half centuries.  He also took 44 catches and made 12 stumpings.

In 1939, the final season before first-class cricket was cancelled due to World War II, he made 27 first-class appearances, and once again passed a thousands runs for the season, making 1,030.  Despite passing this landmark for the fifth straight season, his batting was not quite as successful as it had been in previous seasons, averaging 22.39.  He recorded a single century and four half centuries during this season, as well as taking 30 catches and making 11 stumpings. Including the 1939 season and the preceding four seasons before it, McCorkell had scored 6,791 runs at an average 26.  A reliable glovesman, he also made 502 dismissals from behind the stumps (catches and stumpings combined) during this period. Despite his consistent performances for Hampshire he was unable to force his way into the England Test squad during this decade, due in large part to the presence of Kent wicket-keeper Les Ames, who was considered a superior batsman.

World War II and later career
During World War II, McCorkell was a firefighter at Vickers factory in Newbury, Berkshire. Following the end of the war in 1945, McCorkell resumed his career in county cricket with Hampshire when first-class cricket resumed in 1946 after a six-season break.  Resuming his wicket-keeping duties, McCorkell appeared in 24 first-class matches in that season, scoring 641 runs at an average of 15.26.  This was his worst with the bat since 1934, one in which he made no centuries and recorded just a single half century. This record vastly improved in the 28 first-class appearances he made in the following season, scoring 1,665 runs at an average of 40.60, with a high score of 103 not out, one of two centuries he made that season, in addition to fifteen half centuries he also made.  This season was to be the most successful of his career. In the 1948 season, McCorkell broke his finger and only played 14 matches in total, scoring 754 runs.  The following year Neil scored 1,871 runs the highest season aggregate of his career.

McCorkell retired from first-class cricket in 1951 and subsequently emigrated to South Africa with his family, wife Ethel and two sons Dennis and Ray. He took a position as cricket coach at Parktown Boys' High School in Johannesburg, where he worked for thirty years. The McCorkell Oval is named after him.  He was up to the time of his death Hampshire's oldest surviving player.  On 23 March 2012, McCorkell celebrated his 100th birthday at his Uvongo home, becoming the second Hampshire cricketer after Edward English to reach the landmark, and the thirteenth county cricketer to do so. McCorkell died on 28 February 2013, three weeks before his 101st birthday.

Statistics
McCorkell went on to play 396 first-class matches, scoring 16,106 runs at an average of 25.60, including 17 centuries. He scored a thousand runs in a season on nine occasions, and scored 203 against Gloucester in 1951, his last season. As wicketkeeper, he took 532 catches and 185 stumpings.

See also
Lists of oldest cricketers

Notes

References

1912 births
2013 deaths
Cricketers from Portsmouth
English cricketers
Hampshire cricketers
Players cricketers
English emigrants to South Africa
English cricket coaches
English centenarians
English cricketers of 1919 to 1945
L. H. Tennyson's XI cricket team
Men centenarians
Wicket-keepers